William O'Meara (born 1998) is an Irish hurler who plays as a full-back for club side Askeaton and at inter-county level with the Limerick senior hurling team.

Playing career

University

As a student at the Limerick Institute of Technology, O'Meara was selected for the college's senior hurling team for the Fitzgibbon Cup.

Inter-county

Under-21

O'Meara made his first appearance for the Limerick under-21 team on 7 May 2018 in a 3-18 to 0-13 Munster Championship defeat of Clare.

Senior

O'Meara joined the Limerick senior hurling panel in 2018 and made his first appearance for the team during the pre-season Munster League. On 19 August 2018, O'Meara was a member of the extended panel when Limerick won their first All-Ireland title in 45 years after a 3-16 to 2-18 defeat of Galway in the final.

On 3 March 2019, O'Meara made his first appearance for the Limerick senior team when he came on as a 7th-minute substitute for Seán Finn in a 1-14 to 2-11 National League draw with Clare. On 31 March 2019, he was named on the bench for Limerick's National League final meeting with Waterford at Croke Park. O'Meara collected a winners' medal as a non-playing substitute in the 1-24 to 0-19 victory.

Career statistics

Honours

Limerick
National Hurling League (1): 2019

References

1998 births
Living people
Askeaton hurlers
Limerick inter-county hurlers